The 1987 Overseas Final was the seventh running of the Overseas Final as part of the qualification for the 1987 Speedway World Championship Final to be held in Amsterdam in the Netherlands. The 1987 Final was held at the Odsal Stadium in Bradford, England on 5 June and was the second last qualifying round for Commonwealth and American riders.

The Top 9 riders qualified for the Intercontinental Final to be held in Vojens, Denmark.

1987 Overseas Final
5 June
 Bradford, Odsal Stadium
Qualification: Top 9 plus 1 reserve to the Intercontinental Final in Vojens, Denmark

References

See also
 Motorcycle Speedway

1987
World Individual